Bactrocythara cryera is a species of sea snail, a marine gastropod mollusk in the family Mangeliidae.

Description
The length of the shell attains 5 mm, its diameter 2.1 mm.

Distribution
This marine species is distributed in the Western Atlantic, mainly from Georgia to Florida, USA at depths between 538 m and 805 m

References

  Dall W. H. (1927). Small shells from dredgings off the southeast coast of the United states by the United States Fisheries Steamer "Albatross", in 1885 and 1886; Proceedings of the United States National Museum, 70(18): 1–134

External links
  Tucker, J.K. 2004 Catalog of recent and fossil turrids (Mollusca: Gastropoda). Zootaxa 682:1–1295.
  Bouchet P., Kantor Yu.I., Sysoev A. & Puillandre N. (2011) A new operational classification of the Conoidea. Journal of Molluscan Studies 77: 273–308.

cryera
Gastropods described in 1927